Phebalium longifolium is a species of shrub that is endemic to far north Queensland. It is more or less covered with silvery to rust-coloured scales and has smooth branchlets, narrow elliptical to narrow lance-shaped leaves and cream-coloured flowers in umbels on the ends of branchlets. It grows in the boundary between forest and rainforest in tropical areas.

Description
It is more or less covered with silvery to rust-coloured scales except for the upper surface of the leaves and the front of the petals. The leaves are more or less glabrous and glossy green on the upper surface, densely covered with rust-coloured scales on the lower surface where there is a prominent mid-vein. Flowering occurs from June to September.

Taxonomy and naming
Phebalium longifolium was first formally described in 1959 by Stanley Thatcher Blake in Proceedings of the Royal Society of Queensland from specimens he collected near Wallaman Falls in 1951. In 1970, Paul G. Wilson reduced P. longifolium to P. squamulosum subsp. longifolium, but in 2003, Paul Irwin Forster reinstated P. longifolium in the journal Austrobaileya and the name is accepted by the Australian Plant Census.

Distribution and habitat
This shrub grows on the edge of rainforest between the Herberton Range to the Paluma Range in tropical north Queensland.

Conservation status
This phebalium is classified as "least concern" under the Australian Government Environment Protection and Biodiversity Conservation Act 1999.

References

longifolium
Flora of Queensland
Plants described in 1959
Taxa named by Stanley Thatcher Blake